Edward Kelly (December 1854 – 11 November 1880) was an Australian bushranger, outlaw, gang leader and convicted police-murderer. One of the last bushrangers, he is known for wearing a suit of bulletproof armour during his final shootout with the police.
 
Kelly was born in the then-British colony of Victoria as the third of eight children to Irish parents. His father, a transported convict, died shortly after serving a six-month prison sentence, leaving Kelly, then aged 12, as the eldest male of the household. The Kellys were a poor selector family who saw themselves as downtrodden by the Squattocracy and as victims of persecution by the Victoria Police. While a teenager, Kelly was arrested for associating with bushranger Harry Power and served two prison terms for a variety of offences, the longest stretch being from 1871 to 1874 on a conviction of receiving a stolen horse. He later joined the "Greta Mob", a group of bush larrikins known for stock theft. A violent confrontation with a policeman occurred at the Kelly family's home in 1878, and Kelly was indicted for his attempted murder. Fleeing to the bush, Kelly vowed to avenge his mother, who was imprisoned for her role in the incident. After he, his younger brother Dan, and two associates—Joe Byrne and Steve Hart—shot dead three policemen, the government of Victoria proclaimed them outlaws.

Kelly and his gang eluded the police for two years, thanks in part to the support of an extensive network of sympathisers. The gang's crime spree included raids on Euroa and Jerilderie, and the killing of Aaron Sherritt, a sympathiser turned police informer. In a manifesto letter, Kelly—denouncing the police, the Victorian government and the British Empire—set down his own account of the events leading up to his outlawry. Demanding justice for his family and the rural poor, he threatened dire consequences against those who defied him. In 1880, when his attempt to derail and ambush a police train failed, he and his gang, dressed in armour fashioned from stolen plough mouldboards, engaged in a final gun battle with the police at Glenrowan. Kelly, the only survivor, was severely wounded by police fire and captured. Despite thousands of supporters attending rallies and signing a petition for his reprieve, Kelly was tried, convicted and sentenced to death by hanging, which was carried out at the Old Melbourne Gaol.

Historian Geoffrey Serle called Kelly and his gang "the last expression of the lawless frontier in what was becoming a highly organised and educated society, the last protest of the mighty bush now tethered with iron rails to Melbourne and the world". In the century after his death, Kelly became a cultural icon, inspiring numerous works in the arts and popular culture, and is the subject of more biographies than any other Australian. Kelly continues to cause division in his homeland: some celebrate him as Australia's equivalent of Robin Hood, while others regard him as a murderous villain undeserving of his folk hero status. Journalist Martin Flanagan wrote: "What makes Ned a legend is not that everyone sees him the same—it's that everyone sees him. Like a bushfire on the horizon casting its red glow into the night."

Family background and early life

Ned Kelly's father, John Kelly (known as "Red"), was born in 1820 at Clonbrogan, near Moyglas, County Tipperary in Ireland. At the age of 21, he was found guilty of stealing two pigs and was transported on the prison ship Prince Regent, arriving at Hobart Town, Van Diemen's Land (now Hobart in the Australian state of Tasmania), on 2 January 1842. After finishing his sentence in January 1848, Red moved to the Colony of Victoria and found work at James Quinn's farm at Wallan Wallan as a bush carpenter.

On 18 November 1850, Red married Ellen Quinn, his employer's 18-year-old daughter, at St Francis Church, Father Gerard Ward officiating. The couple subsequently turned their attention to gold-digging and earned enough to buy a small freehold in Beveridge, just north of Melbourne.

Edward ("Ned") Kelly was his parents' third child. The exact date of his birth is not known, but was probably in December 1854. Ned was possibly baptised by an Augustinian priest, Charles O'Hea, who also administered last rites to Kelly before his execution. Ned's parents had seven other children: Mary Jane (born 1851, died as an infant aged 6 months), Annie (later Annie Gunn) (1853–1872), Margaret (later Margaret Skillion) (1857–1896), James ("Jim", 1859–1946), Daniel ("Dan", 1861–1880), Catherine ("Kate", later Kate Foster) (1863–1898) and Grace (later Grace Griffiths) (1865–1940).

Ned Kelly's family did not prosper at Beveridge and his father began drinking heavily. In 1864 the family moved to Avenel, near Seymour, where they soon attracted the attention of local police. As a boy Kelly obtained basic schooling and became familiar with the bush. In Avenel he risked his life to save another boy from drowning in Hughes Creek; the boy's family gave him a green sash, which he wore under his armour during his final showdown with police in 1880.

In 1865, Red was convicted in relation to the theft of a calf and sentenced to a fine of £25 or six months' hard labour. Although the family could not afford to pay the fine, there is no record of Red being transferred to Kilmore Gaol. In December 1866 Red was fined for being drunk and disorderly. Badly affected by alcoholism, he died at Avenel on 27 December 1866.

The following year, the Kellys moved to Greta in north-eastern Victoria, near the Quinns and their relatives by marriage, the Lloyds. In 1868 Ned's uncle Jim Kelly was convicted of arson after setting fire to the rented premises where the Kellys and some of the Lloyds were staying. Jim was sentenced to death, but this was later commuted to fifteen years of hard labour. The Kelly selection was probably unsuitable for successful farming, and Ellen supplemented her income by offering accommodation to travellers and illegally selling alcohol.

Rise to notoriety

Bushranging with Harry Power

In 1869, fourteen-year-old Kelly met Irish-born Harry Power (alias of Henry Johnson), a transported convict who turned to bushranging in north-eastern Victoria after escaping Melbourne's Pentridge Prison. The Kellys formed part of Power's network of sympathisers, and by May 1869 Ned had become his bushranging protégé. At the end of the month, they attempted to steal horses from the Mansfield property of squatter John Rowe as part of a plan to rob the Woods Point–Mansfield gold escort. They abandoned the idea and fled back into the bush after Rowe shot at them, and Kelly temporarily broke off his association with Power.

Kelly's first brush with the law occurred in mid-October 1869 over an altercation between him and a Chinese pig-and-fowl dealer from Morses Creek named Ah Fook. According to Fook, as he passed the Kelly family home, Ned brandished a long stick and declared himself a bushranger before robbing him of 10 shillings. Kelly gave evidence in court that Fook had abused his sister Annie in a dispute over Fook's request for a drink of water; Fook then beat Ned with a stick after he came to his sister's defence. Annie and two family-related witnesses corroborated Ned's story and the charge was dismissed.

Kelly reconciled with Power in March 1870 and, over the next month, the pair committed a series of armed robberies as police scrambled to find them and identify Power's young accomplice. By the end of April, the press had named Kelly as the culprit, and a few days later he was captured by police and confined to Beechworth Gaol. Kelly fronted court on three separate robbery charges, the first two of which were dismissed as none of the victims could positively identify him. On the third charge, the victims also reportedly failed to identify Kelly, but they were in fact refused the chance by Superintendents Nicolas and Hare. Instead, Nicolas told the magistrate that Kelly fitted the description and asked for him to be remanded for trial. Kelly was sent to Melbourne where he spent the weekend in a lock-up before being transferred to Kyneton to face court. No evidence was produced in court, and Kelly was released after a month. 

Historians tend to disagree over this episode: some see it as evidence of police harassment; others believe the Kelly family intimidated the witnesses, making them reluctant to give evidence. Another factor in the lack of identification may have been that the witnesses had described Power's accomplice as a "half-caste" (a person of Aboriginal and European descent). However, the police believed this to be the result of Kelly going unwashed.

Power often camped at Glenmore Station, a large property owned by Kelly's maternal grandfather, James Quinn, which sat at the headwaters of the King River. In June 1870, while resting in a mountainside gunyah (bark shelter) that overlooked the property, Power was captured by a police search party. Following his arrest, word spread within the community that Kelly had informed on him. Kelly denied the rumour, and in a letter that bears the only surviving example of his handwriting, he pleads with Sergeant James Babington of Kyneton for help, saying that "everyone looks on me like a black snake". The informant turned out to be Kelly's uncle, Jack Lloyd, who received £500 for his assistance. However, Kelly had also given information which led to Power's capture and it is possible that the charges against him were dropped in exchange for this information. Power always believed that Kelly was responsible for the betrayal.

Reporting on Power's criminal career, the Benalla Ensign wrote:

Horse theft, assault and imprisonment

In October 1870, a hawker named Jeremiah McCormack accused a friend of the Kellys, Ben Gould, of stealing his horse. Gould wrote an indecent note to give to McCormack's childless wife, that was used to wrap two calves' testicles. Kelly passed the note to one of his cousins to give to the woman. When McCormack confronted Kelly later that day, Kelly punched him in the nose, causing McCormack to fall. Kelly was arrested for his part in sending the calves' parts and the note and for assaulting McCormack. He was sentenced to three months' hard labour on each charge.

Kelly was released from Beechworth Gaol on 27 March 1871, five weeks early, and returned to Greta. Three weeks later, horse-breaker Isaiah "Wild" Wright arrived in town to see his friend Alex Gunn, a Scottish miner who had married Kelly's older sister. Wright was riding a chestnut mare which he had "borrowed" without telling the owner, the postmaster of Mansfield. Kelly later claimed that he was unaware that the horse didn't belong to Wright. According to Kelly, the mare went missing that night and Gunn lent Wright one of his own horses, promising that, if he found the mare, he would keep it until Wright returned. Kelly said that as soon after Wright departed, the mare was found by Gunn and a neighbour, William (Brickey) Williamson. Kelly then took the mare to Wangaratta, where he stayed for four days. 

On 20 April 1871, while riding back into Greta, Kelly was intercepted by Constable Edward Hall, who suspected that the horse was stolen. He directed Kelly to the police station on the pretence of having to sign some papers. As Kelly dismounted, Hall tried to grab him by the scruff of the neck but failed. When Kelly resisted arrest, Hall drew his revolver and tried to shoot him, but it misfired three times. He was then overpowered by Kelly, who later said that he straddled him and dug spurs into his thighs, causing the constable to "[roar] like a big calf attacked by dogs". After subduing Kelly with the assistance of seven bystanders, Hall pistol-whipped him until his head became "a mass of raw and bleeding flesh".

Kelly and Gunn were charged with horse stealing. James Murdoch, a friend and neighbour of the Kellys, gave evidence that Ned had implied to him that the horse was stolen and had tried to recruit him to steal other horses. When it was later revealed that Kelly was still in Beechworth Gaol when the horse was taken, the charges were downgraded to "feloniously receiving a horse". Kelly and Gunn were sentenced to three years' imprisonment with hard labour. Wright received eighteen months for illegal use of a horse. 

Kelly served his sentence at Beechworth Gaol, then at Pentridge Prison. On 25 June 1873, his good behaviour earned him a transfer to the prison ship Sacramento, anchored off Williamstown. He returned to Pentridge after several months and was released on 2 February 1874, six months early, for good behaviour. When he returned to Greta, his brother Jim was in prison for horse theft and his mother soon married an American, George King.

To settle the score with Wright over the chestnut mare, Kelly fought him in a bare-knuckle boxing match at the Imperial Hotel in Beechworth, 8 August 1874. Kelly won after twenty rounds and was declared the unofficial boxing champion of the district. Soon afterwards, a Melbourne photographer took a portrait of Kelly in a boxing pose. Wright became an ardent supporter of Kelly.

Whitty larceny 
After his release from prison, Kelly worked at a sawmill and later for a builder. In early 1877 he joined his step-father in an organised horse stealing operation along with Wright, Brickey Williamson, Joe Byrne, Aaron Sherritt, Allen Lowry and Albert Saxon. Kelly later claimed that the group stole 280 horses. A number of this group also belonged to the Greta Mob, a gang of "bush larrikins" who adopted a distinctive "flash" form of dress. The Greta Mob also included Ned's brothers Jim and Dan, and his cousins Tom and Jack Lloyd.

On 18 September 1877, Kelly was arrested in Benalla for riding over a footpath while drunk. The following day he was involved in a brawl with four police officers who were escorting him to court. Two of the officers involved were constables Alex Fitzpatrick, who was a friend of Kelly, and Tom Lonigan, who had grabbed Kelly by the testicles during the fracas. Kelly was found guilty of being drunk and disorderly, resisting arrest and assaulting a police officer. He was fined and released. The claim that Kelly vowed that if ever he should shoot a man it would be Lonigan is probably apocryphal. However, Kelly later claimed that Fitzpatrick subsequently harassed his family because Kelly had knocked him down during the brawl.

In August 1877 Kelly, with his step-father George King and a number of accomplices, had stolen eleven horses from a paddock owned by James Whitty, a wealthy local grazier. Kelly altered the brands on the horses and sold six of them to William Baumgarten, a horse dealer in Barnawartha, near the New South Wales border. On 26 September the horses were listed as stolen and the police began an investigation. On 10 November, Baumgarten and his brother Gustav were arrested for selling stolen horses and the police were on Kelly's trail. A warrant for his arrest in relation to the "Whitty larceny" was sworn in March 1878 and a further warrant for the arrest of his younger brother Dan was issued on 5 April. George King had disappeared, never to be seen again.

Fitzpatrick incident

Fitzpatrick's version of events

On 11 April 1878, Constable Strachan, the officer in charge of Greta police station, heard that Kelly was at a shearing shed in New South Wales and was given leave to apprehend him. Constable Fitzpatrick was ordered to Greta for relief duty. Fitzpatrick read in the Police Gazette of a warrant for Dan Kelly's arrest for horse stealing, and he discussed with his sergeant at Benalla the idea of calling at the Kelly home on the way to Greta to arrest Dan. The sergeant agreed but warned him to be careful. On 15 April, Fitzpatrick rode through Winton en route to Greta, stopping at the hotel there where he had one brandy and lemonade.

Finding Dan not at home, Fitzpatrick remained with Kelly's mother, in conversation, for about an hour. Three children were also present. According to Fitzpatrick, upon hearing someone chopping wood, he went to ensure that the chopping was licensed. The man proved to be Brickey Williamson, a neighbour, who said that he didn't need a licence because he was chopping wood on his own selection.

Fitzpatrick saw two horsemen making towards the Kelly house. The men proved to be the teenaged Dan Kelly and his brother-in-law, Bill Skillion (also known as Bill Skilling). Fitzpatrick returned to the house and made the arrest. Dan asked to be allowed to have dinner before leaving. The constable consented, and stood guard over his prisoner. 

Minutes later, Ned Kelly rushed in through the front door and fired a shot at Fitzpatrick with a revolver, missing him. Kelly's mother then hit Fitzpatrick over the head with a fire shovel. There was a struggle and Kelly fired two more shots, wounding Fitzpatrick just above his left wrist. During the struggle, Skillion and Williamson entered the room, both armed with revolvers. Dan disarmed Fitzpatrick and now had his revolver.

Ned told Fitzpatrick that he wouldn't have fired at him if he had known it was him. Fitzpatrick fainted and when he regained consciousness Kelly compelled him to extract the bullet from his own arm with a knife; Kelly's mother dressed the wound. Kelly concocted a cover story and said that if Fitzpatrick told this story he would reward him after the Baumgarten case was over. Kelly's mother said that if he mentioned what really happened his life would be no good to him. Fitzpatrick was allowed to leave. He had ridden away about a mile when he found that two horsemen were pursuing, but by spurring his horse into a gallop he escaped to the Winton hotel and was assisted inside by the manager. His wound was rebandaged and he was given a brandy and water. The manager then rode with him to Benalla where he reported the affair to his superior officer.

Kelly family version of events

In an interview three months before his execution, Kelly said that at the time of the incident, he was 200 miles from home. According to him, his mother had asked Fitzpatrick if he had a warrant and Fitzpatrick replied that he had only a telegram, to which his mother said that Dan need not go. Fitzpatrick then said, pulling out a revolver, "I will blow your brains out if you interfere". His mother replied, "You would not be so handy with that popgun of yours if Ned were here". Dan then said, trying to trick Fitzpatrick, "There is Ned coming along by the side of the house". While he was pretending to look out of the window for Ned, Dan cornered Fitzpatrick, took the revolver and released Fitzpatrick unharmed. If Fitzpatrick suffered any wounds they were possibly self-inflicted. Skillion and Williamson were not present.

In 1879 Ned's sister Kate, who was aged 14 at the time of the incident, stated that Kelly shot Fitzpatrick after the constable had made a sexual advance to her. After Kelly was captured, he denied that Fitzpatrick tried to take liberties with Kate: "No, that is a foolish story; if he or any other policeman tried to take liberties with my sister, Victoria would not hold him".

In 1929 journalist J. J. Kenneally gave yet another version of the incident based on interviews with the remaining Kelly brother, Jim, and Kelly cousin and gang providore Tom Lloyd. In this version Fitzpatrick was drunk when he arrived at the Kelly house, and while sitting in front of the fire he pulled Kate onto his knee, provoking Dan to throw him to the floor. In the ensuing struggle, Fitzpatrick drew his revolver, Ned appeared, and with his brother seized the constable, disarming him, but not before he struck his wrist against the projecting part of the door lock, an injury he claimed to be a gunshot wound.

Three police officers later gave sworn evidence that Kelly, after his capture, admitted he had shot Fitzpatrick. In 1881, Brickey Williamson, who was seeking remission for his sentence in relation to the incident, stated that Kelly shot Fitzpatrick after the constable had drawn his revolver. Jones and Dawson have argued that Kelly shot Fitzpatrick but it was his friend Joe Byrne who was with him, not Bill Skillion.

Trial
Williamson, Skillion and Ellen Kelly were arrested and charged with aiding and abetting attempted murder; Ned and Dan were nowhere to be found. The three appeared on 9 October 1878 before Judge Redmond Barry. Fitzpatrick's doctor, who had treated his wound, gave evidence that the constable "was certainly not drunk" and that his wounds were consistent with his statement. The defence declined to call Ned's sisters, Kate and 12-year-old Grace, to give evidence even though they were eyewitnesses. The defence did call two witnesses to give evidence that Skillion wasn't present, which would cast doubt on Fitzpatrick's entire evidence. One of these witnesses was a friend of the Kellys, the other, Joe Ryan, a relative. Ryan revealed that Ned was in Greta that afternoon, which was damaging to the defence. Ellen Kelly, Skillion and Williamson were convicted as accessories to the attempted murder of Fitzpatrick. Skillion and Williamson both received sentences of six years' and Ellen three years of hard labour.

Ellen's sentence was considered harsh, even by people who had no cause to be Kelly sympathisers, especially as she was nursing a newborn baby. Alfred Wyatt, a police magistrate in Benalla, told the later Royal Commission, "I thought the sentence upon that old woman, Mrs Kelly, a very severe one."

Stringybark Creek police murders

After the Fitzpatrick incident, Ned Kelly, Dan Kelly and Joe Byrne went into hiding and were soon joined by Steve Hart, a friend of Dan. They were based at Bullock Creek in the Wombat Ranges, where they made money sluicing gold and distilling whisky, and were supplied with provisions and information by sympathisers including Ned's cousin Tom Lloyd.

The police had received information that the Kelly gang were in the Wombat Ranges at the head of the King River and, on 25 October 1878, two mounted police parties were dispatched to search for them. One party, consisting of Sergeant Michael Kennedy and constables Michael Scanlan (sometimes spelled Scanlon), Thomas Lonigan and Thomas McIntyre camped overnight in an abandoned mining site at Stringybark Creek, about twenty-five miles north of Mansfield. They were unaware that they were only 1.5 miles from the Kelly gang's hideout and that Ned had observed their tracks.

On the following morning, Kennedy and Scanlan went scouting while McIntyre and Lonigan remained at the camp. At about 5 p.m. the four members of the Kelly gang emerged from the bush and ordered the two policemen in the camp to bail up and raise their arms. According to McIntyre, each member of the gang was armed with a rifle, but according to Ned they only had two guns. McIntyre was unarmed at the time and raised his arms. According to McIntyre, Lonigan made a motion to draw his revolver and ran for the cover of a tree a few yards away. Ned immediately shot Lonigan, killing him. According to Ned, Lonigan had ducked behind a fallen tree and Ned shot him as he raised his head to fire.

The Kelly gang questioned McIntyre and armed themselves with the policemen's shotgun and revolvers. At about 5.30 p.m., Kennedy and Scanlan returned on horseback and the Kelly gang hid themselves. According to McIntyre, he walked towards Kennedy but before he could speak to him, the Kelly gang ordered the police to bail up. Kennedy tried to unclip his gun holster and shots were fired by the gang. McIntyre advised Kennedy to surrender as he was surrounded. Meanwhile, Scanlan dismounted and was shot while trying to unsling his rifle. McIntyre stated that Scanlan didn't have time to fire a shot. According to Ned, Scanlan fired and Ned shot him as he tried to fire again. Scanlan died soon after.

Kennedy had dismounted and, according to McIntyre, tried to surrender without firing a shot, but the gang continued firing at him. According to Kelly, Kennedy hid behind a tree and started firing. Kennedy retreated into the bush. Ned and Dan pursued him for almost a mile, exchanging gunfire with the sergant, before Ned shot him in the right side. According to Ned, Kennedy then turned around to face him and Ned shot him in the chest with his shotgun, not realising that Kennedy had dropped his revolver and was turning to surrender.

In the exchange of gunfire, McIntyre, who was still unarmed, mounted Kennedy's horse and was able to escape. He reached Mansfield police station the following day and a search party quickly found the bodies of Lonigan and Scanlan. Kennedy's body was found two days later. The bodies had been looted of watches, rings, and other personal items. Post-mortem examinations showed that Lonigan had been shot three times: through the arm, the leg and the right eye, the latter being the cause of death. Scanlan had four bullet wounds. Kennedy had at least two bullet wounds, one a shotgun wound through the chest fired from very close range.

McIntyre's initial accounts of the shootout were given at Mansfield on 27 October and at the inquest into the deaths of Lonigan and Scanlan on 29 October. Kelly's initial accounts of the killings were given in his Cameron Letter of December 1878 and Jerilderie Letter of February 1879. These, and later accounts by McIntyre and Kelly, varied in their details. Jones, Morrissey and others have questioned the credibility of some aspects of both versions of events.

In the Jerilderie letter, Kelly claimed that he had been told that a number of police officers had boasted that they would shoot him without giving him a chance to surrender. He also claimed that the weapons (especially the two rifles) and amount of ammunition the police party carried indicated their intention of killing him rather than arresting him. He claimed that these circumstances, and the failure of the police to surrender when ordered to, justified him killing them in self-defence. McIntyre stated that he told Kelly that the intention of the police party was to arrest him and that they were not excessively armed in the circumstances. He stated that it was the Kelly gang who confronted the police with their weapons drawn and that they did not give the police a realistic chance to surrender.

Outlawed under the Felons Apprehension Act

News of the police murders led to widespread fear of the bushrangers. On 28 October the government of Victoria announced a reward of £800 (£200 per head) for their arrest and this was soon increased to £2,000. On 31 October 1878, the Victorian parliament passed the Felons Apprehension Act, which came into effect on 1 November. Three days later, notices were published throughout the colony giving the bushrangers until 12 November to surrender themselves. On 15 November the four members of the Kelly gang, not having surrendered themselves, were declared outlaws. As a result members of the gang could be killed without challenge by anyone finding them armed or who had a reasonable suspicion that they were armed. The act also penalised anyone who gave "any aid, shelter or sustenance" to the outlaws or withheld information, or gave false information, to the authorities. Punishment was "imprisonment with or without hard labour for such period not exceeding fifteen years". The Felons Apprehension Act eventually lapsed on 26 June 1880, just before the siege at Glenrowan.

The Victorian act was based on the New South Wales Felons Apprehension Act of 1865, which had been enacted in response to the bushrangers Dan Morgan and Ben Hall. In response to the Kelly gang, the New South Wales parliament re-enacted their legislation as the Felons Apprehension Act 1879 (NSW).

Euroa raid

After the police killings, the Kelly gang unsuccessfully attempted to escape across the flooded Murray River into New South Wales before returning to their base in north-eastern Victoria. They had narrowly avoided the police on several occasions and were relying on the support of the extended Kelly family, criminal associates and other sympathisers.

In need of money, the Kelly gang planned to rob the bank in the small town of Euroa. On Sunday 8 December 1878, Byrne scouted the town and reported back that there would be a funeral and a sitting of the Licensing Court on the following Tuesday afternoon that many in the town would be attending. At 12.30 p.m. on 9 December, the gang held up the Younghusband pastoral sub-station at Faithfull's Creek, 3.5 miles from Euroa. Fourteen male employees and passers-by were taken hostage and held overnight in a brick outbuilding near the Faithfull's Creek homestead; female hostages were held in the homestead. One of the hostages was a passing hawker who supplied the four members of the gang with new, respectable clothes. It is probable that the hawker and a number of other hostages were sympathisers of the gang and had prior knowledge of the raid.

The following day, Dan guarded the hostages while Ned, Byrne and Hart rode out to cut the telegraph wires connecting Euroa to the outside world. After he did so, the gang encountered a hunting party and some railway workers, whom they held up and took back to Faithfull's Creek as hostages. Ned, Dan and Hart then went into Euroa, leaving Byrne to guard the prisoners.

Just after 4 p.m., the three gang members knocked at the doors of the closed National Bank of Australasia at Euroa and gained entry from the front and back. They drew their revolvers and held up both the bank and the bank manager's living quarters. They emptied the safes and cashiers' drawers of cash and gold worth £2,260 and a small number of documents and securities. The fourteen members of the bank manager's household and staff were taken back to the Faithfull's Creek homestead as hostages. There the gang performed some trick riding for the hostages, who now numbered thirty-seven people, before leaving at about 8.30 p.m., warning their captives to remain where they were for three hours or there would be reprisals.

Following the raid, a number of newspapers commented on the efficiency of its execution and compared it with the inefficiency of the police who had failed to capture the gang in the six weeks since the Stringybark police killings. Several hostages stated that the gang had behaved courteously and without violence during the raid. However, hostages also stated that on several occasions Kelly and other gang members had become enraged and had cocked their revolvers and pointed them at hostages, threatening to shoot them. The gang had also threatened to burn buildings containing hostages if there was any resistance.

Cameron Letter 
While at the Faithfull's Creek homestead, Byrne wrote out two fair copies of a letter that had been dictated by Kelly. On 14 December 1878, the copies were posted to Donald Cameron, a Victorian parliamentarian who Kelly wrongly thought was sympathetic to the gang, and John Sadleir, the police superintendent at Benalla. In the letter, Kelly made claims of police corruption and harassment of his family and gave his version of the Fitzpatrick incident, the Stringybark police killings and other events. Kelly expected Cameron to read the letter out in parliament, but the government refused to make it public. Newspapers, however, published summaries of its contents with commentary. Kelly later repeated much of the contents of the letter in the longer Jerilderie Letter.

Kelly sympathisers held

On 2 January 1879, police used the Felons Apprehension Act to obtain warrants for the arrest of presumed Kelly sympathisers for aiding the outlaws. Thirty men were arrested in the following days and twenty-three were remanded in custody. Among the leading Kelly sympathisers who were held were Tom Lloyd Jr, Jimmy Quinn, Wild Wright and Joe Ryan. Over a third were released within seven weeks due to lack of evidence, but a core of nine sympathisers had their remand renewed on a weekly basis for almost three months, despite the failure of the police to produce evidence for a committal hearing. Police claimed that their informants were reluctant to give sworn evidence for fear of reprisals.

On 22 April, Police Magistrate Foster refused prosecution requests to continue remands and discharged the remaining eleven detainees. Although the police command was disturbed by this decision, by then it was clear that the tactic of holding sympathisers on continuous remand had not impeded the activities of the Kelly gang.

Jones argues that the decision to hold key Kelly sympathisers without trial for several months swung public sympathy away from the police. Dawson, however, points out that while there was widespread condemnation of the denial of the civil liberties of those detained, this didn't necessarily mean there was widespread support for the outlaws.

Jerilderie raid

Following the Euroa raid, fifty-eight police were transferred to north-eastern Victoria (making a total of 217 police in the district), around fifty soldiers were deployed to guard banks in the region, and the reward for Kelly's capture was increased to £1,000. The Kelly gang had distributed most of the proceeds from the raid to family, friends and associates who had given them assistance. The outlaws were once more in need of funds, and planned to rob the bank at Jerilderie, a town of 500 residents about forty miles across the border in New South Wales. A number of sympathisers moved into the town in the days before the raid to provide information and undercover support for the gang.

On Friday, 7 February 1879, the Kelly gang crossed the Murray River between Mulwala and Tocumwal and camped overnight in thick forest. The following day they visited Davidson's Inn, about two miles from Jerilderie, where they drank and chatted with patrons and staff, learning more about the town and the police presence there.

Just after midnight on the morning of Sunday, 9 February, the gang went to Jerilderie police barracks, about half a mile from the town centre, on the pretext of alerting the police to a fictitious brawl at Davidson's Inn. After confirming that there were only two policemen presentSenior Constable George Devine and Probationary Constable Henry Richardsthe gang drew their revolvers and bailed up the policemen. They secured the policemen in the lockup near the main building and spent the night in the residential quarters of the police station, where they held Devine's wife and young children hostage.

The Kelly gang spent most of Sunday morning preparing for the bank robbery while many of the town's population were attending church. In the afternoon, Byrne and Hart, dressed in police uniforms, took the disarmed Constable Richards with them into town so they could familiarise themselves with its layout. Richards was told to introduce the strangers as police reinforcements sent to search for the Kelly gang. The three then returned to the police barracks and the gang finalised plans for the following day's raid.

At 10 a.m. on 10 February, Kelly and Byrne donned police uniforms and the four outlaws took Richards with them into town. They had left Devine in the police lockup and had warned Mrs Devine that if she tried to leave the barracks they would burn it down with her and the children inside.

The gang went into the main street of Jerilderie and held up the Royal Mail Hotel, which was next door to the Bank of New South Wales. They took the hotel staff and patrons hostage and, as the raid progressed, anyone walking into the hotel was captured and held in the hotel's parlour. It is almost certain that some of those held were sympathisers planted by the outlaws. Ned and Byrne then entered the bank from the rear, leaving Dan and Hart in control of the hotel. Ned and Byrne held up the bank, taking £2,141 in cash as well as jewellery and other valuables. Ned also took deeds, mortgages and securities from the safe which he later had burned because "the bloody banks are crushing the life's blood out of the poor, struggling man". The bank staff and several patrons were taken prisoner and transferred to the parlour of the hotel.

Byrne then held up the post office and destroyed the morse key and insulator. Following this, several of the prisoners were ordered to take axes and bring down the telegraph poles and wires. Once the telegraph was cut, Ned went with two hostages to the newspaper owner's home where he asked for copies of his Jerilderie letter to be printed. The newspaper owner, however, had earlier escaped capture at the bank and fled the town.

After a detour to appraise a locally famous race horse, Ned returned to the hotel and delivered a speech to the hostages outlining his grievances against the police and the justice system. He then told the hostages, who now numbered about thirty, that they were free to go. However, he took Richards and the two post office workers (who knew how to operate the telegraph) with him to the police barracks.

Back at the barracks, the gang secured the two policemen and two post office workers in the lockup and prepared to leave with the proceeds from the bank robbery, the police horses and police weapons. Mrs Devine was threatened with reprisals if she released the prisoners before 7.30 p.m. Dan and Byrne then rode out of Jerilderie. Ned and Hart rode back into town where Ned stayed a short while, drinking at the Albion (Traveller's Rest) Hotel with the strangers who had recently entered the town and were soon to leave. While there, the local parson, John B. Gribble, persuaded Ned to leave the race horse he had taken as it belonged to "a young lady". When Kelly and Hart left, they were not seen again by the police for 17 months.

Jerilderie Letter

Prior to arriving in Jerilderie, Kelly composed a lengthy letter with the aim of tracing his path to outlawry, justifying his actions, and outlining the alleged injustices he and his family suffered at the hands of the police. He also decried the treatment of poor selector families by Victoria's Squattocracy and, in "an escalating promise of revenge and retribution", invoked "a mythical tradition of Irish rebellion" against what he called "the tyrannism of the English yoke". Dictated to Byrne, the Jerilderie Letter, a handwritten document of fifty-six pages and 7,391 words, was described by Kelly as "a bit of my life". He tasked Edwin Living, a local bank accountant, with delivering it to the editor of the Jerilderie and Urana Gazette for publication. Due to political suppression, only excerpts were published in the press, based on a copy transcribed by John Hanlon, owner of the Eight Mile Hotel in Deniliquin. The entire letter was rediscovered and published in 1930.

According to historian Alex McDermott, "Kelly inserts himself into history, on his own terms, with his own voice. ... We hear the living speaker in a way that no other document in our history achieves". It has been interpreted as a proto-republican manifesto; for others, it is a "murderous, ... maniacal rant", and "a remarkable insight into Kelly's grandiosity". Noted for its unorthodox grammar, the letter reaches "delirious poetics", Kelly's language being "hyperbolic, allusive, hallucinatory ... full of striking metaphors and images". His invective and sense of humour are also present; in one well-known passage, he calls the Victorian police "a parcel of big ugly fat-necked wombat headed, big bellied, magpie legged, narrow hipped, splaw-footed sons of Irish bailiffs or English landlords". The letter closes:

Reward increase and disappearance
 
In response to the Jerilderie raid, the New South Wales government and several banks collectively issued £4,000 for the gang's capture, dead or alive, the largest reward offered in the colony since £5,000 was placed on the heads of the outlawed Clarke brothers in 1867. The Victorian government matched the offer for the Kelly gang, bringing the total amount to £8,000, bushranging's largest-ever reward.

The Victorian police continued to receive many reports of sightings of the outlaws from the public and information about their activities from their network of paid informants. The Chief Commissioner of Police, Frederick Standish, and Superintendent Francis Hare directed operations against the gang from Benalla. Hare organised frequent search parties and surveillance of the close family and associates of the outlaws.

In March 1879, six Queensland native police troopers and a senior constable under the command of sub-Inspector Stanhope O'Connor were deployed to Benalla to join the hunt for the Kelly gang. O'Connor and his troopers, at the time of the request, were in active service in the Cooktown region conducting punitive expeditions against Aboriginal communities and had recently massacred thirty people near Cape Bedford. Although Kelly feared the tracking ability of the Aboriginal troopers, Standish and Hare doubted their value and they were not put to their best use. The Aboriginal troopers were withdrawn on 25 June 1880, but quickly re-engaged following the murder of police informant Aaron Sherritt the following day.

On 7 May 1879, Standish provided the Victorian Land Board with a list of eighty-four family members and other alleged sympathisers of the outlaws in order to prevent them buying land in the secluded areas of north-eastern Victoria. The avowed aim of the policy was to disperse the Kelly family and its sympathisers and disrupt stock theft in the region. The impact of the policy is controversial. Jones and others claim that it caused widespread resentment and hardened support for the outlaws. Morrissey, however, states that although the policy was sometimes used unfairly, it was effective and supported by the majority of the community.

On 3 July 1879, following media and parliamentary criticism of the cost and lack of success of the Kelly gang search, Standish appointed Assistant Commissioner Charles Nicolson in charge of operations at Benalla in place of the injured Hare. Standish removed fourteen troopers and seventeen foot police from Nicolson's command, withdrew most of the soldiers guarding banks, and cut the budget for the search. Nicolson responded by cutting back search parties and relying more heavily on targeted surveillance and his network of spies and informers.

On 2 June 1880, after almost a year of unsuccessful efforts to capture the outlaws, Nicolson was replaced by Hare. On 20 May a police informant, Daniel Kennedy, had reported that the Kelly gang had successfully made bullet-proof armour out of agricultural equipment and were planning another raid. On 25 June, Kennedy personally reported this information to Hare. Hare dismissed the intelligence as preposterous and sacked Kennedy.

Glenrowan affair

Murder of Aaron Sherritt

During the Kelly outbreak, police watch parties monitored houses belonging to relatives of the gang, including that of Byrne's mother in the Woolshed Valley near Beechworth. The police used the house of her neighbour, Aaron Sherritt, former Greta Mob member and lifelong friend of Byrne, as a base of operations, sleeping inside during the day and keeping watch from nearby caves at night. Sherritt accepted police payments for camping with the watch parties and for providing information on the bushrangers' activities. It is likely that Sherritt also gave the police false information in order to protect Byrne. Detective Michael Ward was particularly sceptical of Sherritt's value as an informer.

In March 1879 Byrne's mother discovered Sherritt with a police surveillance party and later publicly denounced him as a spy. In the following months, Byrne and Ned sent Sherritt messages stating that the Lloyds and Quinns wanted him shot and that it would be better for him if he joined the outlaws. When Sherritt continued his relationship with the police, Byrne warned Sherritt's mother that the outlaws were going to kill him. The gang finally decided to murder Sherritt as part of their own plan, one that they boasted would "astonish not only the Australian colonies, but the whole world".

On 26 June 1880, Dan and Byrne rode into the Woolshed Valley. That evening, they kidnapped Anton Wick, who lived near Sherritt, and forced him to come with them to Sherritt's hut, which was occupied by Sherritt, his pregnant wife Ellen, Mrs Barry (Ellen's mother) and four policemen who had been stationed in the hut to guard Sherritt and spy on Mrs Byrne's home. 

At about 6.30 p.m., Dan went to the front door of the hut while Byrne forced Wick to knock on the back door and call out for Sherritt. When Sherritt answered the door, Byrne shot him in the throat and chest with a shotgun, killing him. Byrne then entered the hut and Dan was let in while the four policemen hid in the bedroom. Byrne heard the police scrambling for their shotguns and demanded that they come out. When the police didn't respond he fired into the bedroom. He then sent Ellen into the bedroom to bring the police out, but they held her in the room.

The outlaws left the hut with Mrs Barry, collected kindling, and loudly threatened to burn alive those inside. They sent Mrs Barry back inside and the police detained her in the bedroom. After a failed attempt to set fire to the building, the outlaws stayed outside yelling threats at the occupants. They then released Wick and rode away. The siege had lasted two hours.

The police didn't leave the hut until the following morning, for fear that the bushrangers would be still waiting outside for them. News of Sherritt's death only reached Hare in Benalla at 2.30 p.m. on Sunday, 27 June.

Siege and shootout

The gang estimated that the policemen inside Sherritt's hut would relay news of his murder to Beechworth by early Sunday morning, prompting a special police train to be sent up from Melbourne. They also surmised that the train would collect reinforcements in Benalla before continuing through Glenrowan, a small town in the Warby Ranges. There, the gang planned to derail the train and shoot dead any survivors, then ride to an unpoliced Benalla where they would rob the banks, set fire to the courthouse, blow up the police barracks, release anyone imprisoned in the gaol, and "generally play havoc with the entire town" before returning to the bush.

While Byrne and Dan were in the Woolshed Valley, Ned and Hart tried, but failed, to damage the track at Glenrowan, so they forced two local platelayers and some labourers camped nearby to finish the job. The outlaws selected a sharp curve in the line that ran across a deep ravine, and told their captives that they were going to "send the train and its occupants to hell".

Byrne and Dan had now arrived at Glenrowan and the gang had taken over the railway station, the stationmaster's home and Ann Jones' Glenrowan Inn, opposite the railway station and just under a mile from the town centre. The gang used the hotel to hold the workers, passers-by, and other male prisoners they gathered throughout the night and following day. Most of the women and children taken prisoner were held at the stationmaster's home. The other hotel in town, McDonnell's Railway Hotel, located on the other side of the tracks, was used to stable the gang's stolen horses, one of which carried a tin of blasting powder and fuses. The armour was designed to provide protection for the outlaws as they stood on top of the embankment firing down on any survivors of the train wreck. There was no leg armour as it would hinder the outlaws' movement and wasn't necessary given the angle of any return fire up the embankment.

By Sunday afternoon, the expected train still had not arrived and the outlaws had moved most of the women and children to the Glenrowan Inn. There were now sixty-two hostages including sympathisers who the gang had planted to help control the situation. As the hours passed without any sight of the train, the gang plied the hostages with drink and organised music, singing, dancing and games. One hostage later testified, "[Ned] did not treat us badly—not at all". However, Ned threatened to shoot another young hostage, keeping him "in a state of extreme terror for about half an hour".

During the late afternoon and evening of Sunday, Ned allowed twenty-one of the hostages who he considered trustworthy to leave. At about 10 p.m. he and Byrne captured Glenrowan's lone constable, Hugh Bracken, with the assistance of hostage Thomas Curnow, a local schoolmaster who sought to gain the gang's trust in order to thwart their plans. Believing that Curnow was a sympathiser, Ned let him and his wife return to their home close to the railway tracks, but warned them to "go quietly to bed and not to dream too loud".

The police train Ned had been expecting only left Benalla after 2 a.m. on Monday. The train carried seven regular troopers under Superintendent Hare, five Queensland Aboriginal Troopers under sub-Inspector O'Connor, four journalists and several other civilians. Acting on intelligence that the tracks had been sabotaged, Hare had ordered a pilot engine to travel ahead of the police train. At 2.30 a.m., the pilot train was approaching Glenrowan when Curnow went to the tracks, signalled it to stop and alerted the driver of the danger.

Kelly had decided to let the hostages return home and was delivering them a lecture about police informers when Byrne came in from outside with the news that a train had arrived. The outlaws donned their armour and prepared themselves for a confrontation. Meanwhile, Bracken told the hostages to lie low and escaped to the railway station to explain the situation to the police. On hearing Bracken's news, Hare immediately led a detachment of police towards the hotel while the main body of troopers prepared the horses and equipment. It was just after 3 a.m.

The four outlaws positioned themselves in the shadow of the veranda in the front of the hotel and opened fire when the police were about thirty yards away in the moonlight. The police returned fire and about 100 to 150 shots were fired in fifteen minutes. Someone shouted that there were women and children in the building and there was a lull in the shooting. Hare was wounded in the left wrist and soon had to return to Benalla for treatment. Ned was wounded in the left hand and arm and his right foot. Byrne was shot in the leg and retreated into the hotel. Two hostages were fatally wounded by police fire through the thin weatherboard walls of the building: thirteen-year-old John Jones and railway worker Martin Cherry. A third hostage, George Metcalf, was also fatally wounded, either by police fire or shot accidentally by Ned in an earlier incident.

During the lull in the firing, a number of hostages, mostly women and children, escaped from the hotel. Kelly, bleeding heavily from his wounds, retreated behind the hotel and made his way into the bush where police found his skull cap and rifle at around 3.30 a.m., about 100 yards from the hotel. Kelly later stated that at that time he was in the bushes not far from the police.

Police surrounded the hotel throughout the night, and the firing continued intermittently. At about 5 a.m., Byrne was fatally shot in the groin while making a toast to the Kelly gang in the bar. Between 5.30 a.m. and 7 a.m. police reinforcements under Sergeant Steele and Superintendent Sadleir arrived from Wangaratta and Benalla, taking the police contingent to about forty.

Last stand and capture

Seriously wounded, Kelly lay in the bush for most of the night. At dawn (about 7 a.m.), dressed in his armour and armed with three handguns, he came out of the bush and attacked the police from their rear. Eyewitnesses variously compared the figure moving in the early morning mist to a bunyip, the devil, and a ghost. Journalist Tom Carrington wrote:

Police returned fire as Kelly moved towards the hotel, staggering from his injuries, the weight of his armour, and the impact of bullets on the plate iron, which he later described as "like blows from a man's fist." Kelly had difficulty aiming, firing and reloading his weapons due to his injuries and limited vision through his helmet.

The gun battle lasted under half an hourDan and Hart providing intermittent covering fire from the hoteluntil Steele brought down Ned with two shotgun blasts to his unprotected legs and thighs. Ned was disarmed and carried to the railway station where a doctor attended to his injuries. He was later found to have more than twenty-eight wounds, including serious gunshot wounds to his left elbow and right foot, multiple less serious gunshot wounds, and cuts and abrasions from his armour. 

In the meantime the siege continued. Around 10 a.m., a ceasefire was called and the remaining thirty hostages left the hotel. The police ordered the hostages to lie down and they were checked to ensure that the outlaws were not among them. Two of the hostages were arrested for being known Kelly sympathisers.

Fire and aftermath

By Monday afternoon, a crowd of some 600 spectators had gathered at Glenrowan, and Dan and Hart had ceased shooting. Unwilling to allow his men to storm the hotel, Sadleir ordered a cannon to be sent to blast out the outlaws but then decided to burn them out. At 2.50 p.m, Senior Constable Charles Johnson, supported by covering fire from the police, set fire to the Glenrowan Inn.

Matthew Gibney, a Catholic priest, entered the burning building in an attempt to rescue anyone inside and discovered the bodies of Byrne, Dan and Hart. The exact circumstances of the deaths of Dan and Hart remain a mystery. Police recovered the body of Byrne from the hotel bar and rescued the seriously wounded hostage Martin Cherry from the kitchen behind the hotel, but he died soon after. After the fire died out at 4 p.m., the police recovered the badly burnt bodies of Dan and Hart.

The death toll at Glenrowan included three members of the Kelly gang and the hostages Cherry, John Jones (who died the following day at Wangaratta Hospital) and George Metcalf (who died from his gunshot wound several months later). Jones' sister Jane received a head wound during the siege from a stray bullet, and two years later died from a lung infection that her mother believed was hastened by the injury. Others wounded were hostages Michael Reardon and his baby sister Bridget (who was grazed by a bullet), Superintendent Hare and an Aboriginal trooper.

The following day, the police tied Byrne's body to the door of the Benalla lockup to be photographed. His friends asked for the body, but the police instead arranged a hasty inquiry and burial in a pauper's grave in Benalla Cemetery. The charred remains of Dan and Hart were taken to Greta and buried by their families in unmarked graves in the local cemetery.

Trial and execution

Kelly survived to stand trial on 19 October 1880 in Melbourne before Sir Redmond Barry, the judge who had earlier sentenced Kelly's mother to three years in prison for the attempted murder of Fitzpatrick. Charles Smyth and Arthur Chomley appeared for the Crown, and the novice barrister Henry Bindon for the prisoner. Kelly was presented on the charge of murdering constables Lonigan and Scanlan, but was never charged with the murder of Sergeant Kennedy. The trial was adjorned to 28 October and the prosecution chose not to proceed with the charge of Scanlan's murder. 

Kelly was convicted of the willful murder of Lonigan and sentenced to death by hanging. After handing down the sentence, Barry concluded with the customary words, "May God have mercy on your soul", to which Kelly replied, "I will go a little further than that, and say I will see you there where I go". Barry was to die of natural causes only twelve days after Kelly's execution.

On 3 November, the Executive Council of Victoria decided that Kelly was to be hanged eight days later, 11 November, at the Old Melbourne Gaol. In the week leading up to the execution, thousands turned out at street rallies across Melbourne demanding a reprieve for Kelly, and on 8 November, a petition for clemency with over 32,000 signatures, some of which were of a suspicious nature, was presented to the governor's private secretary. The Executive Council announced soon after that the hanging would proceed as scheduled.

The day before his execution, Kelly had his photographic portrait taken as a keepsake for his family, and he was granted farewell interviews with relatives. One newspaper reported that his mother's last words to him were, "Mind you die like a Kelly", but Jones and Castles have questioned this. 

The following morning, John Castieau, the governor of the gaol, informed Kelly that the hour of execution had been fixed at 10 a.m. Kelly's leg-irons were removed, and at 9 a.m. he was led out by warders accompanied by the chaplain Dean Donaghy. When passing the gaol's garden he commented on the beauty of the flowers. Accounts differ about Kelly's last words. Some newspaper reporters wrote that it was, "Such is life", while other newspapers recorded that this was his response when Castieau told him of the intended hour of his execution, earlier that day. The Argus wrote that Kelly's last words were, "Ah, well, I suppose it has come to this", as the rope was placed round his neck. According to another account, Kelly intended to make a speech, but "made no audible sound". The warden later wrote that Kelly, when prompted to say his last words, mumbled something indiscernible.

Armour

Royal Commission and aftermath

In March 1881, the Victorian government approved a Royal Commission into the conduct of the Victorian police during the Kelly Outbreak. Over the next six months, the commission, chaired by Francis Longmore, held sixty-six meetings, examined sixty-two witnesses and visited towns throughout "Kelly Country". While its report found that the police had acted properly in relation to the criminality of the Kellys, it exposed widespread corruption and ended a number of police careers, including that of Chief Commissioner Standish. Numerous other officers, including senior staff, were reprimanded, demoted or suspended. It concluded with a list of thirty-six recommendations for reform. Kelly hoped that his death would lead to an investigation into police conduct, and although the report did not exonerate him or his gang, its findings were said to strip the authorities "of what scanty rags of reputation the Kellys had left them."

The £8,000 reward money was divided among various claimants with £6,000 going to members of the Victorian police, Superintendent Hare receiving the lion's share of £800. Curnow complained about his payout of £550, and the following year it was upgraded to £1,000. Seven Aboriginal trackers involved in the siege were each awarded £50, but their money was given to the Victorian and Queensland governments for safekeeping, the Reward Board's argument being, "It would not be desirable to place any considerable sum of money in the hands of persons unable to use it."

There was media and police speculation that there would be further outbreaks of violence in north-eastern Victoria following Kelly's execution. Jones and Dawson argue that changes in policing methods reduced this threat. The police held informal discussions with the Kelly family to assure them that they would be treated fairly if they kept the peace. The police no longer pursued a policy of dispersing the family and their sympathisers by denying them land in north-eastern Victoria, but rather explicitly tied access to land to lawful behaviour. During the Royal Commission there were threats of violence and intimidation against people who had assisted the police. Nevertheless, the police reported a reduction in horse and cattle theft and crime in general in the region following Kelly's death.

Kelly's mother was released from prison in February 1881. Jones states that she met with Greta police constable Robert Graham soon after, and they reached an understanding which helped reduce tension in the community. Mrs Kelly died, aged 95, on 27 March 1923.

Remains and graves

In line with the practice of the day, no records were kept regarding the disposal of an executed person's remains. Kelly was buried in the "old men's yard", just inside the walls of Old Melbourne Gaol.

Dissection
On 14 May 1881, a newspaper reported that Kelly's body was dissected by medical students who removed his head and organs for study. Dissection outside of a coronial enquiry was illegal. Public outrage at the rumour raised real fears of public disorder, leading the commissioner of police to write to the gaol's governor, who denied that a dissection had taken place. Saw cuts on a piece of his occipital bone recovered in 2011 confirmed that a dissection had indeed been done.

Thefts of remains
In 1929, Old Melbourne Gaol was closed for routine demolition, and the bodies in its graveyard were uncovered during the demolition works. During the recovery of the bodies, spectators and workers stole skeletal parts and skulls from a number of graves, including one marked with an arrow and the initials "E.K." in the belief they belonged to Kelly. The E.K. marked grave was situated by itself, and on the opposite side of the yard where the rest of the graveyard was situated. 

The site foreman, Harry Franklin, retrieved the skull from the E.K. marked grave and gave it to the police. As no provision had been made for the disposal of the remains, Franklin had the bodies reburied in Pentridge Prison at his own expense. The skull from the E.K. marked grave, which had been stored at the Victorian Penal Department, was taken to Canberra for research by Sir Colin Mackenzie, the first director of the Australian Institute of Anatomy, in 1934. For a period of time it was lost, but was later found while cleaning out an old safe in 1952.

From 1972 the skull was put on display at the Old Melbourne Gaol until it was stolen on 12 December 1978. An investigation in 2010 proved that the displayed skull was in fact the one recovered in 1929.

Historical and forensic investigation of remains
On 9 March 2008, it was announced that Australian archaeologists believed they had found Kelly's grave on the site of Pentridge Prison. The bones were uncovered at a mass grave and Kelly's were among those of thirty-two felons who had been executed by hanging. Jeremy Smith, a senior archaeologist with Heritage Victoria, said that, "We believe we have conclusively found the burial site but that is very different from finding the remains". Ellen Hollow, Kelly's then 62-year-old grand-niece, offered to supply her own DNA to help identify his bones.

On the anniversary of Kelly's hanging, 11 November 2009, Tom Baxter handed the skull in his possession to police. It was historically and forensically tested along with the Pentridge remains. The skull was compared to a cast of the skull that had been stolen from the Old Melbourne Gaol in 1978 and proved to be a match. The skull was then compared to that in a newspaper photograph of worker Alex Talbot holding the skull recovered in 1929 which showed a close resemblance. Talbot was known to have taken a tooth from the skull as a souvenir and a media campaign to find the whereabouts of the tooth led to Talbot's grandson coming forward. The tooth was found to belong to the skull, confirming it was indeed the skull recovered in 1929. 

In 2004, before the skull was handed to police, a cast of the skull was made and compared to the death masks of those executed at Old Melbourne Gaol, which eliminated all but two. The two were those of Kelly and Ernest Knox, who had been executed in March 1894 (headstone marked E.K., 19–3–94) and buried near Frederick Deeming (headstone marked with the initials A.W. and a D underneath). In April 1929, the skulls of the E.K. marked grave (which was thought at the time to belong to Kelly) and Deeming were looted from the excavated graves. The death mask of Knox and a facial reconstruction of a cast of the skull were a close match.

In 2010 and 2011, the Victorian Institute of Forensic Medicine performed a series of craniofacial super-imposition, CT scanning, anthropology and DNA tests on the skull recovered from the E.K. grave and concluded it was not Kelly's. In 2014, the remains of Deeming's brother was exhumed from Bebington cemetery and tissue samples were obtained from a femur bone. A DNA profile was successfully obtained from the samples and compared with a DNA profile that had been previously obtained from the skull that was stolen from the Old Melbourne Gaol. The DNA profiles did not match, conclusively proving that the skull is not Deeming's. It is now accepted that the skull recovered in 1929 and later displayed in the Old Melbourne Gaol was not Kelly's or Deeming's.

Forensic pathologists also examined the bones from Pentridge, which were much decayed and jumbled with the remains of others, making identification difficult. The collar bone was found to be the only bone that had survived in all the skeletons and these were all DNA tested against that of Leigh Olver. A match to Kelly was found and the associated skeleton turned out to be one of the most complete. Kelly's remains were additionally identified by partially healed right foot, right knee and left elbow injuries matching those caused by the bullet wounds at Glenrowan as recorded by the gaol's surgeon in 1880 and by the fact that his head was missing, likely removed for phrenological study. A section from the back of a skull (the occipital) was recovered from the grave that bore saw cuts that matched those present on several neck vertebrae, indicating that the skull section belonged to the skeleton and that an illegal dissection had been performed.

In August 2011, scientists publicly confirmed a skeleton exhumed from the old Pentridge Prison's mass graveyard was indeed Kelly's after comparing the DNA to that of Leigh Olver. The DNA matching was based on mitochondrial DNA (HV1, HV2). This is indicative of Kelly's maternal line. The investigating forensic pathologist had indicated that no adequate quality somatic DNA was obtained that would enable a y-DNA profile to be determined. This may be attempted at a later date. A y-DNA profile would enable Kelly's paternal genetic genealogy to be determined with reference to the data already existing in the Kelly y-DNA study (see this page). The skeleton was missing most of its skull, the whereabouts of which are unknown.

Final burial
On 1 August 2012, the Victorian government issued a licence for Kelly's bones to be returned to the Kelly family, who made plans for his final burial. The family also appealed for the person who possessed Kelly's skull to return it.

On 20 January 2013, Kelly's relatives granted his final wish and buried his remains in consecrated ground at Greta cemetery near his mother's unmarked grave. A piece of Kelly's skull was also buried with his remains and was surrounded by concrete to prevent looting. The burial followed a Requiem Mass held on 18 January 2013 at St Patrick's Catholic Church in Wangaratta.

Headstone
During the Great Depression, the Bayside City Council built bluestone walls to protect local beaches from erosion. The stones were taken from the outer walls of the Old Melbourne Gaol and included the "headstones" of those executed and buried on the grounds. Most, including Kelly's, were placed with the engravings (initials and date of execution) facing inwards.

Legacy

Kelly myth
The myth surrounding Ned Kelly has become pervasive in Australian culture, and Kelly has become one of Australia's most recognised national symbols. Academic and folklorist Graham Seal writes:

Seal argues that the Ned Kelly story taps into a number of myths including the Robin Hood tradition of the outlaw hero and the myth of the Australian bush as a place of freedom from oppressive authority. Kelly is often seen as the embodiment of characteristics thought to be typically Australian such as defying authority, siding with the underdog and fighting bravely for one's beliefs. According to Ian Jones, after Kelly's death, "a Robin Hood-like figure survived: good-looking, brave, a fine horseman and bushman and a crack shot, devoted to his mother and sisters, a man who treated all women with courtesy, who stole from the rich to give to the poor, who dressed himself in his enemy's uniform to outwit him. Most of all a man who stood against the police persecutors of his family and was driven to outlawry when he defended his sister against a drunken constable. Such was Ned Kelly the myth[.]" Seal states that Kelly was aware of the tradition of the bushranger-hero and attempted to live up to the myth. The Euroa and Jerilderie raids were partly public performances where the Kelly gang acted courteously to women, burned mortgage documents and entertained their hostages.

By the time Kelly was outlawed, the bushranger was an anachronism. Australia was highly urbanised, the telegraph and the railway were rapidly connecting the bush to the city, and Kelly was already an icon for a romanticised past. For Seal, the failure of the Kelly gang to derail the train at Glenrowan was a symbol of the triumph of modern civilisation. Macintyre states that Kelly turning agricultural equipment into defensive armour was an irresistible symbol of a passing era.

Seal concludes, "[T]he figure of Ned Kelly has led to the creation of a national image that bears some relation to the man himselfperhaps about the same resemblance as Ned Kelly's armour had to the plough mouldboards from which it was beaten....He is different things to different peoplea murderer, an Australian Robin Hood, a social bandit, a revolutionary leader, even a commercial commodity. But to most of us he is somehow essentially Australian".

Cultural impact

Thanks to the telegraph, the siege at Glenrowan became a national and international media event. Songs, poems, popular entertainments, fiction, books, and newspaper and magazine articles about the Kelly gang proliferated in the decades after Kelly's death. By 1943 there were forty-two major published works about Kelly.

Kelly has figured prominently in Australian cinema since the 1906 release of The Story of the Kelly Gang, the world's first dramatic feature-length film. Among those who have portrayed him on screen are Australian rules football player Bob Chitty (The Glenrowan Affair, 1951), rock musician Mick Jagger (Ned Kelly, 1970), John Jarratt (The Last Outlaw, 1980), Heath Ledger (Ned Kelly, 2003) and George MacKay (True History of the Kelly Gang, 2019). A comic film, Reckless Kelly (1993), drew on the Kelly legend.

In the visual arts, Sidney Nolan's 1946–47 Kelly series is considered "one of the greatest sequences of Australian painting of the twentieth century". His stylised depiction of Kelly's helmet has become an iconic Australian image. Hundreds of performers dressed as "Nolanesque Kellys" starred in the opening ceremony of the 2000 Sydney Olympics.

In literature, Douglas Stewart's verse drama Ned Kelly was first performed in 1942. Robert Drewe's Our Sunshine (1991) is a fictionalised account of the Glenrowan siege. In 2001, Peter Carey won the Booker Prize for his novel True History of the Kelly Gang, written from Kelly's perspective, which resulted in a 2019 film of the same name with the Anglo-Australian actor George MacKay portraying Kelly. The Ned Kelly Awards are Australia's premier prizes for crime fiction and true crime writing.

The first ballads about the Kelly gang were published in 1879 and it quickly became a popular genre. In 1939 Tex Morton recorded a country and western-style ballad about Kelly, and singers including Slim Dusty, Smoky Dawson and Buddy Williams followed. Non-Australian artists who have recorded songs about Kelly include Waylon Jennings and Johnny Cash.

The term "Kelly tourism" describes towns such as Glenrowan which sustain themselves economically "almost entirely through Ned's memory", while "Kellyana" refers to the collecting of Kelly memorabilia, merchandise, and other paraphernalia. The phrase "such is life", Kelly's probably apocryphal final words, has become an oft-quoted part of the legend. "As game as Ned Kelly" is an expression for bravery, and the term "Ned Kelly beard" is used to describe a trend in "hipster" fashion. The rural districts of north-eastern Victoria are collectively known as "Kelly Country".

Controversy over political legacy

In 1969 Eric Hobsbawm, in Bandits, argued that Ned Kelly was in the tradition of the social bandit, a type of peasant outlaw and symbol of social rebellion with significant community support. McQuilton expanded on the social bandit thesis, arguing that the Kelly outbreak should be seen in the context of deteriorating economic conditions in rural Victoria in the 1870s and a conflict over land between selectors (mostly small farmers) and squatters (mostly wealthier pastoralists who had initially acquired their runs by "squatting" on Crown land). Jones, Molony and others argue that Kelly was a political rebel with considerable support among selectors and labourers in north-eastern Victoria. Jones claims that Kelly intended to derail the train at Glenrowan to incite a rebellion of disaffected selectors and declare a "Republic of North-eastern Victoria".

Others have disputed these claims. Morrissey argues that McQuilton and Jones have exaggerated the degree of economic distress and support for Kelly among local selectors. Dawson argues that Kelly did not draw up a republican declaration or plan a political rebellion, writing: "there is no mention of any such document, plan or intention in any record of Kelly’s day, nor in the numerous interviews and memoirs of those connected with the gang, or its prisoners who listened to Kelly’s speeches while held up, nor in the work of early historians of the outbreak who knew the Kellys, their gang, their sympathisers, or the pursuing police."

Seal states that Kelly proposed "a basic form of wealth redistribution" in his Jerilderie Letter, when the outlaw suggested that the wealthy squatters of the district should establish a charitable fund for the local poor, orphans and widows. Morrissey sees the social justice element of the letter as a traditional call for the rich to help the poor with an additional argument that it is in their own interest to do so. While Kelly frequently complained of oppression by the police and squatters, and evoked historical Irish grievances against the English, his response was expressed in terms of a violent reckoning rather than a political program.

See also
 List of people on the postage stamps of Ireland
 Steph Ryan, the incumbent member for Euroa, is a distant relative of Ned Kelly.

References

Bibliography
Non-fiction

 
 
 
 
 

 
 
 
 
 
 
 
 
 
 

 

 
 

 

Fiction

External links

 Kelly, Ned (1855–1880) National Library of Australia, Trove, People and Organisation record for Ned Kelly
 The Kelly collection, including John Hanlon's transcript of the Jerilderie letter at the National Museum of Australia
 Ned Kelly Historical Collection, Public Records Office of Victoria
 Culture Victoria – historical images and video interview with Peter Carey about his novel "True History of the Kelly Gang"
 
 
 

1854 births
1880 deaths
19th-century Australian criminals
Australian bank robbers
Bushrangers
Australian outlaws
People executed for murder
People executed by Australia by hanging
Australian people of Irish descent
Colony of Victoria people
People executed by Victoria (Australia)
People executed for murdering police officers
Australian people convicted of murdering police officers
Executed Australian people
People convicted of murder by Victoria (Australia)
19th-century executions by Australia
1878 murders in Australia
People from the City of Whittlesea